This is a list of fortifications in Bosnia and Herzegovina, including fortresses and castles, arranged alphabetically.

List 
The list is based on body of work in Bosnia and Herzegovina historiography.

See also
List of castles
List of World Heritage Sites in Bosnia and Herzegovina
List of National Monuments of Bosnia and Herzegovina

References

Further reading

Bosnia and Herzegovina
Fortifications
Fortifications
Bosnia
f
Fortifications